Aadarsh Rathore (Adarsh Rathore) in Hindi आदर्श राठौर, (born 12 June 1988) is an Indian journalist, musician and folk singer of Himachal Pradesh, most known for his rap song, Dhikkar Hai about the corruption in 2010 Commonwealth Games, New Delhi. He became popular in social networking sites after it was uploaded online.

Born in Joginder Nagar, Himachal Pradesh, he works as  online journalist with BBC News Hindi. Earlier he was working with The Times Group. Before that he worked in a few news channels. He had initiated a campaign against the rampant corruption in CWG New Delhi. His song for the campaign  was a big hit among the internet users worldwide. He bears the title to be the first rapper in a Himachali Dialect. He was appreciated for his Himachal Version of Kolaveri Di.

Works

Ase Himachali (2009)
Aaija Ghara Jo (2009)
Dhikkar Hai (2010)
Shareef Mahnu (2011)

References

External links
 आ गया जोगिन्दर नगर के आदर्श राठौर का हिमाचली कोलावरी डी
 Himachali Version of Kolavari Di by Aadarsh Rathore

Indian male folk singers
1988 births
People from Jogindernagar
Living people
Singers from Himachal Pradesh
Indian male television journalists